Anoplius ithaca is a species of spider wasp in the family Pompilidae.

References

Pompilinae
Articles created by Qbugbot